The 2006 Thailand Open was a men's tennis tournament played on indoor hard courts. It was the 4th edition of the Thailand Open, and was part of the International Series of the 2006 ATP Tour. It took place at the Impact Arena in Bangkok, Thailand, from 25 September through 1 October 2006. James Blake won the singles title.

Entrants

Seeds

 Rankings are as of September 25, 2006.

Other entrants
The following players received wildcards into the main draw:
 Mikhail Ledovskikh
 Feliciano López
 Marin Čilić
The following players received entry from the qualifying draw:
 George Bastl
 Michael Ryderstedt
 Lars Burgsmüller
 Mischa Zverev
The following players received the Lucky loser spot:
 Benjamin Balleret
 Satoshi Iwabuchi

Finals

Singles

 James Blake defeated  Ivan Ljubičić, 6–3, 6–1.

Doubles

 Jonathan Erlich /  Andy Ram defeated  Andy Murray /  Jamie Murray, 6–2, 2–6, [10–4].

References

External links
Thailand Open on the official Association of Tennis Professionals website

 
 ATP Tour
Tennis, ATP Tour, Thailand Open
Tennis, ATP Tour, Thailand Open

Tennis, ATP Tour, Thailand Open
Tennis, ATP Tour, Thailand Open